Jamie Clayton (born on January 15, 1978) is an American actress and model. Clayton is best known for starring as Nomi Marks in the Netflix original series Sense8, Sasha Booker in the third season of Designated Survivor and Tess Van De Berg in Showtime's The L Word: Generation Q. She portrays Pinhead in the 2022 Hellraiser film.

Early life
Clayton was raised in San Diego,  California. Her father, Howard Clayton, was a criminal defense attorney, and her mother, Shelley, is an event planner. When she was 19, Clayton moved to New York City to pursue a career as a makeup artist.

Career
In 2010, Clayton was the makeup artist and co-host on VH1's first makeover show TRANSform Me. The following year she played the recurring role of Kyla in the third season of the HBO series Hung. In 2012, Clayton played the lead role of Michelle Darnell on the Emmy Award winning interactive web series Dirty Work and the role of Carla Favers on the TV series Are We There Yet? She also narrated the audiobook for the children's novel Melissa about a young transgender girl.

Clayton starred as one of the eight main characters in the Netflix original television series Sense8 that premiered on June 5, 2015. In Sense8 she played Nomi Marks, a trans woman, political blogger, and hacker living in San Francisco. Clayton said that she was primarily interested in Sense8 because of the opportunity to play a transgender character written by filmmakers Lilly and Lana Wachowski and to be on set with them. Being a fan of science fiction and J. Michael Straczynski in particular also attracted her to this project.

Clayton appeared in the 2016 film The Neon Demon and the 2017 thriller film The Snowman.

In 2019, Clayton starred as Sasha Booker in the third season of the Netflix's Designated Survivor.

From 2019 through Season 3, Clayton starred in The L Word: Generation Q, the sequel to the Showtime original The L Word. She also guest starred in The CW’s Roswell: New Mexico.

In 2022, Clayton starred as Pinhead, the antagonist in Hellraiser.

Personal life
In 2011, Clayton was honored by Out magazine as part of their annual "Out 100" awards.

Filmography

References

External links
 
 

1978 births
Living people
Actresses from San Diego
American film actresses
American television actresses
Female models from California
American LGBT actors
LGBT people from California
Transgender actresses
Transgender female models